Pyropia rakiura, formerly known as Porphyra rakiura, is a red alga species in the genus Pyropia, known from New Zealand. It is monostromatic, monoecious, and grows in the intertidal zone, predominantly on rock substrata. With P. cinnamomea, P. coleana and P. virididentata, they can be distinguished by morphology (such as the microscopic arrangement of cells along their thallus margin, their thallus shape, size and colour), as well as geographical, ecological and seasonal distribution patterns, and importantly, chromosome numbers, which in this species n = 2. Finally, these four species are distinguished by a particular nucleotide sequence at the 18S rDNA locus.

Distribution 
This species can be found on the mid to low intertidal zone of coasts on the southern North Island, the South Island and Stewart Island in New Zealand as well as on the coasts of Australia.

References

Further reading
Brodie, Juliet, et al. "Making the links: towards a global taxonomy for the red algal genus Porphyra (Bangiales, Rhodophyta)." Journal of applied phycology20.5 (2008): 939–949.
Hemmingson, J. A., and W. A. Nelson. "Cell wall polysaccharides are informative in Porphyra species taxonomy." Journal of applied phycology 14.5 (2002): 357–364.
Nelson, W. A., J. E. Broom, and T. J. Farr. "Pyrophyllon and Chlidophyllon (Erythropeltidales, Rhodophyta): two new genera for obligate epiphytic species previously placed in Porphyra, and a discussion of the orders Erythropeltidales and Bangiales." Phycologia 42.3 (2003): 308–315.

External links

AlgaeBase
WORMS

Bangiophyceae
Flora of New Zealand